Roberto Russo (born 19 November 1966, Cosenza) is an Italian pianist and composer.

Biography 
He began piano studies with his father Mario Russo then following piano Maestros Daniel Rivera, Franco Scala and Maria Tipo. Guest in various classical music festivals of Europe and America since 1985. As a composer he studied in Italy with Silvano Sardi and Domenico Bartolucci; his compositions have been performed in Italy, France, Norway, Poland, Denmark and USA.

His performing have been recorded or broadcast by Italian RAI, Radio Televisión Argentina, Houston Public Radio, Radio Vaticana, III Millennio Music Editions and Liszt Institute of Bologna (Italy). As a piano teacher he taught at various Italian Conservatories, giving also Masterclasses at Music University in Tromsø (Norway), at Conservatory of Music in Oviedo (Spain), at Academy of Music in Kraków (Poland) and at the National University of Music Bucharest (Romania).

Since 1998 he plays together with Italian tenor Alessandro Maffucci. He also premiered works by English composer Michael Stimpson. In 2012 he has been appointed as a member of Steinway Artists by the prestigious piano brand of Hamburg and New York

Reviews 
Roberto Russo has been reviewed many times.

Compositions 
 Sonata for viola and piano (1993)
 Pater Noster, for "a cappella" choir (1995)
 In Monte Oliveti, for "a cappella" choir (1995)
 La rosa blanca, per mezzo-soprano e pianoforte (2000)
 Madre, for "a cappella" choir (2001)
 Ave Maria, for "a cappella" choir (2002)
 12 Preludes for piano (2002)
 Fantasia for cello and piano (2008)

Notes

Sources
 La rosa blanca, per mezzo-soprano e pianoforte (2000)

Italian classical pianists
Male classical pianists
Italian male pianists
1966 births
Living people
21st-century classical pianists
21st-century Italian male musicians